The Oldenhorn (Swiss German: Oldehore;  or Becca d'Audon) is a mountain in the western Bernese Alps in Switzerland. The summit is the tripoint between the cantons of Vaud, Berne and Valais.

The Oldenhorn is the second highest peak of the massif of the Diablerets and canton of Vaud. It overlooks the Tsanfleuron Glacier on the south and the Col du Pillon on the north.

The summit can be easily reached by the east ridge in less than three hours. The nearby Scex Rouge (2,950 m) is connected from the Col du Pillon by a cable car. The Tsanfleuron Glacier must be crossed.

References

External links

 Oldenhorn, summitpost.org
Oldenhorn, sac-oldenhorn.ch (Oldenhorn section of the Swiss Alpine Club SAC )
Reusch - Oldenhorn, glacier3000.ch (Hike to the summit of the Oldenhorn.)

Mountains of the Alps
Alpine three-thousanders
Mountains of Switzerland
Mountains of the canton of Vaud
Mountains of Valais
Mountains of the canton of Bern
Bern–Valais border
Valais–Vaud border
Bern–Vaud border